James L. Fitzgerald is an Indologist at Brown University. He studied at the University of Chicago, receiving his B.A. in 1971, his M.A. in Sanskrit in 1974 and his Ph.D. in Sanskrit and South Asian Civilizations in 1980. At Chicago he studied primarily with J. A. B. van Buitenen. From 1978 Fitzgerald joined the  Department of Religious Studies at the University of Tennessee. In 2007 he was appointed Purandara Das Distinguished Professor of Sanskrit in the Department of Classics, Brown University.

Fitzgerald's main research interest has been India's great Sanskrit epic, the Mahābhārata, see Mahabharata.

Publications

Books
The Mahabharata: Book 11: The Book of the Women, Book 12: The
Book of Peace, Part One. Translated, edited, and annotated by James L.
Fitzgerald. 848 p., 1 halftone, 1 map, 4 charts, 7 tables. Chicago:
University of Chicago Press, 2004.

In progress
The Mahabharata: Book 12: The Book of Peace, Part Two. Translated,
edited, and annotated by James L. Fitzgerald. Chicago: University of
Chicago.

Other projects
1981
Edited the posthumous publication of J. A. B. van Buitenen’s The
Bhagavad Gītā in the Mahābhārata (Chicago: University of Chicago
Press, 1981).

Articles

In press, 2009
“The Sāṃkhya-Yoga “Manifesto” at MBh 12.289-290,” in proceedings
of the 13th World Sanskrit Conference, John Brockington, ed. (Delhi:
Motilal Banarsidass): 185-212.

In press, 2009
“A Preliminary Study of the 681 Triṣṭubh Passages of the
Mahābhārata,” in proceedings of the 12th World Sanskrit Conference,
Robert Goldman and Muneo Tokunaga, editors (Delhi: Motilal
Banarsidass, in press): 95-117.

In press, 2009
“No Contest between Memory and Invention: The Invention of the
Pāṇḍava Heroes of the Mahābhārata,” in the proceedings volume of the
conference “Epic and History: Ancient and Medieval,” Brown
University, December, 2006.

2007
“Bhīṣma beyond Freud: The Fall of the Sky, Bhīṣma in the
Mahābhārata, 1,” in Epic Constructions: Gender, Myth, and Society in
the Mahābhārata, edited by Brian Black and Simon Brodbeck (London:
Routledge, 2007): 189-207.

2006
“Negotiating the Shape of ‘Scripture’: New Perspectives on the
Development and Growth of the Epic Between the Empires,” in Between
the Empires, edited by Patrick Olivelle (Oxford: Oxford University
Press, 2006): 257-87.

2006
“Toward a Database of the Non-Anuṣṭubh Verses of the Mahābhārata,”
in Epics, Khilas, and Purāṇas: Continuities and Ruptures, Petteri
Koskikallio, ed., Proceedings of the Third Dubrovnik International
Conference on the Sanskrit Epics and Purāṇas (Zagreb: Croatian
Academy of Sciences and Arts, 2006): 137-148.

2004
“Dharma and Its Translation in the Mahābhārata,” Journal of Indian
Philosophy 32.5 (Dec. 2004): 671-685.

2003
“The Many Voices of the Mahābhārata:” A Review Article of
Rethinking the Mahābhārata: A Reader's Guide to the Education of the
Dharma King by Alf Hiltebeitel (Chicago: University Of Chicago Press,
2001), Journal of The American Oriental Society 123.4 (2003): 803-18.

2004
“Mahābhārata,” in The Hindu World, Sushil Mittal and Gene Thursby,
eds. (New York and London: Routledge, 2004): 52-74.

2002
“Nun Befuddles King, Shows karmayoga Does Not Work: Sulabhā’s
Refutation of King Janaka at MBh 12.308,” Journal of Indian
Philosophy 30.6 (December, 2002): 641-77.

2002
“The Rāma Jāmadagnya Thread of the Mahābhārata: A New Survey of
Rāma Jāmadagnya in the Pune Text,” in Mary Brockington, ed., Stages
and Transitions: Temporal and Historical Frameworks in Epic and
Purāṇic Literature, Proceedings of the Second Dubrovnik International
Conference on the Sanskrit Epics and Purāṇas, August, 1999 (Zagreb,
Croatian Academy of Sciences and Arts, 2002): 89-132.

2002
“Making Yudhiṣṭhira the King: The Dialectics and the Politics of
Violence in the Mahābhārata,” Rocznik Orientalistyczny LIV (2001):
63-92.

2000
“pīta and śaikya/saikya: Two Terms of Iron and Steel Technology in the
Mahābhārata,” Journal of the American Oriental Society, 120.1
(January–March 2000): 44-61.

1998
“Some Storks and Eagles Eat Carrion; Herons and Ospreys Do Not:
Kaṅkas and Kuraras (and Baḍas) in the Mahābhārata,” Journal of the
American Oriental Society, 118.2 (April–June 1998): 257-61.

1993
Articles on dharma, śānti, and Vyāsa in the Harper Dictionary of
Religion (New York: Harper and Row, 1993).

1988
“Review article of Peter Brook's Production of the Mahābhārata,”
Soundings, LX, No. 3-4 (Winter, 1988): 539-51.

1985
“India’s Fifth Veda: The Mahābhārata’s Presentation of Itself,” Journal
of South Asian Literature, XX.1 (1985): 125-40. Reprinted in Essays on
the Mahābhārata, edited by Arvind Sharma (Leiden: E. J. Brill, 1991):
150-71.

1983
“The Great Epic of India as Religious Rhetoric: A Fresh Look at the
Mahābhārata,” Journal of the American Academy of Religion, LI.4
(December, 1983): 611-630.

1978
Annotated translation of Ṛgveda I.113, in Appendix I of The Meaning of
Aphrodite, Paul Friedrich (Chicago: University of Chicago Press, 1978).

References

External links
The Mahābhārata at Brown University

American Indologists
Living people
Year of birth missing (living people)
University of Chicago alumni
Brown University faculty